GFH is a financial investment group, with headquarters in Bahrain Financial Harbour (Bahrain), listed on the Bahrain Stock Exchange, Kuwait Stock Exchange and Dubai Financial Market. In 2007, GFH listed its GDR's  in the London Stock Exchange. They provide diversified investment and commercial portfolio in sectors that includes Wealth Management, Commercial Banking, Asset Management, Real Estate Investments.

Financial information
 Paid up share capital US$1,253,626,348.755 
 Number of shares 4,730,665,467
 Par Value USD0.265

Board of Directors
 Dr. Ahmed Al-Mutawa (chairman)
 Mosabah Al-Mutairy (vice chairman)
 Bashar Mohammed Al-Mutawa 
 Dr. Khalid M. Al-Khazraji
 Mohammed Duaij Al-Khalifa
 Mohammed Ali Talib (board member)
 Faisal Abdulla Abubshait
 Yousef Ibrahim Yousef AlGhanim

Executive Team
 Hisham Ahmed Al-Rayes. Chief Executive Officer
 Chandan Gupta. Group Chief Financial Officer
 Mohammed Ameen Ahmed Ali. Chief Administrative Officer
 Dr. Mohammed Yousif Abdulsalam. Head of Sharia’a & Corporate Secretary
 Ajay Subramanian. Head of Risk Management
 Salem Patel. Head of Investment Management
 Elias Karaan. Head of Real Estate Development
 Mohammed Abdulmalik. Acting Head of Investment Relationship Management
 Hazim Abdulkarim. Head of Fund Administration
 Bahaa Al Marzooq. Head of Internal Audit
 Mohammed Bukamal. Head of Human Resources & Development
 Mazin A.Rahim AlGhareeb. Head of Treasury & Capital Markets
 Nabeel Mirza. Compliance Director & MLRO

External links
 Official website

References

Banks of Bahrain
Islamic banks
Investment banks
Companies listed on the Dubai Financial Market